Ivan Hašek (born 30 August 1987) is a Czech former footballer who played as a midfielder.

Personal life
Hašek comes from a sporting family. His father Ivan Hašek is a famous Czech footballer, who played for and later managed the national team, while his older brother, Pavel, also played in the Czech First League.

References

External links
 

Czech footballers
1987 births
Living people
Czech First League players
Bohemians 1905 players
FK Čáslav players

Association football midfielders